FARICE-1 is a submarine communications cable connecting Iceland, the Faroe Islands and Scotland.  The cable has been in use since January 2004 and is 100% owned by the Icelandic state. The cable had an initial design capacity of 720 Gbit/s and is a two fibre pair design. The length of the cable is 1205 km for the direct route between Iceland and Scotland. The cable structure and repeaters were made by Pirelli and the terminal equipment was supplied by TYCO.  In the year 2013 the terminal equipment was upgraded by Ciena (100Gbit/s technology)  bringing the total capacity of the submarine cable to 11 Tbit/s. The cable has service access points in Reykjavik and Keflavik Airport as well as in London Telehouse East. The company Farice ehf sells services over the FARICE-1 cable. FARICE-2 was never built. DANICE is the complementary submarine cable.

The landing points are:
 1. Seyðisfjörður, Iceland, backhauled to Reykjavík and KEF Airport
 3. Funningsfjørður, Faroe Islands, backhauled to 4. Tórshavn
 5. Dunnet Bay, Caithness, Highland, Scotland, backhauled to London Telehouse (previously Edinburgh)

See also
DANICE
SHEFA-2
Greenland Connect
CANTAT-3

References

External links

Complete network with DANICE as Service Access Points.

Infrastructure completed in 2004
2004 establishments in Iceland
2004 establishments in Scotland
Telecommunications in Iceland
Telecommunications in Scotland
Telecommunications in Norway
Scottish coast
Submarine communications cables in the North Atlantic Ocean
Transatlantic communications cables
Iceland–United Kingdom relations
Norway–United Kingdom relations
Iceland–Norway relations
2004 establishments in the Faroe Islands